Lijia is a town in Heishan County, Liaoning province, China. , it administers the following 13 villages:
Lijia Village
Lijia Village
Jiajia Village
Loujia Village
Pingfang Village
Guangsheng Village
Shuanggangzi Village
Yanjia Village
Cuigangzi Village
Qianxing Village
Dasunjia Village
Heiyutou Village
Zhaijia Village

References

Township-level divisions of Liaoning
Heishan County